Tatyana Alexandrovna Beck (April 21, 1949, Moscow —  February 7, 2005, Moscow) was a Russian poet, literary critic and literary scholar. She was a member of the Union of Soviet Writers (1978), and Russian PEN Center, and Secretary of the Moscow Writers' Union (1991-1995). She was the daughter of writer Alexander Bek.

In 1993, she signed the Letter of Forty-Two.

She died, according to the official version, from a massive heart attack, but many discussed the likelihood of suicide due to bullying by colleagues Yevgeny Rein, Mikhail Sinelnikov, Igor Shklyarevsky and literary critic Sergei Chuprinin.

References

External links
 Tatyana Bek at  Lib.ru

1949 births
2005 deaths
Writers from Moscow
Soviet women poets
Russian women poets
Russian literary critics
Russian women critics
Literary scholars
Translators to Russian
Soviet translators
Russian translators
Translators from Danish
Russian memoirists